is a former Japanese football player.

Football career
Kawaharazuka was born in Saitama Prefecture on February 1, 1975. After graduating from high school, he played for newly was promoted to J2 League club, Albirex Niigata in 1999. However he could hardly play in the match and left the club end of 1999 season. He also played for Regional Leagues club Okinawa Kariyushi FC in 2002.

Beach Soccer career
Kawaharazuka was selected Japan national beach soccer team for 2005, 2006, 2008, 2009, 2011 and 2013 FIFA Beach Soccer World Cup.

Club statistics

References

External links

1975 births
Living people
Association football people from Saitama Prefecture
Japanese footballers
J2 League players
Japanese beach soccer players
Albirex Niigata players
Association football forwards